The International Union of Physiological Sciences, abbreviated IUPS, is the global umbrella organization for physiology.

IUPS aims to facilitate initiatives that strengthen the discipline of physiology. IUPS is a scientific union member of the International Council for Science (ICSU), and is accredited with the World Health Organization (WHO).
The Union is composed of 54 National Members, 10 Associate Members, 2 Affiliated Members, 5 Regional Members and 5 Special Members.  IUPS organizes an international congress every 4 years and, in association with the American Physiological Society publishes the review journal Physiology. in 2020 it established the journal Physiome to publish and curate mathematical models of physiological systems, the Physiome.

Since 2010 IUPS has participated  in the interdisciplinary activities of Bio-Unions/ICSU.

Congresses

Previous Presidents 

 1953-1956 Charles Best
 1956-1959 Corneille Heymans
 1959-1962 Bernardo Houssay
 1962-1968 G.L. Brown
 1968-1971 Wallace Fenn
 1971-1974 Yngve Zotterman
 1974-1980 Eric Neil
 1980-1986 Knut Schmidt-Nielsen
 1986-1993 Andrew Huxley
 1993-1997 Masao Ito
 1997-2001 Ewald Weibel
 2001-2005  Alan Cowley
 2005-2009 Akimichi Kaneko
 2009-2017  Denis Noble
 2017-2022  Julie Chan

Previous Secretaries General 

 1953-1959 Maurice Visscher
 1959-1965 Wallace Fenn
 1965-1971 JW Duyff
 1971-1980 Robert Hunsperger
 1980-1986 J Scherrer 
 1986-1993 Robert  Nacquet
 1993-2001 Denis Noble
 2001-2009 Ole Petersen
 2010-2017 Walter Boron

Structure 
There are eight Commissions 
Locomotion
 Circulation & Respiration
 Endocrine, Reproduction & Development
Neurobiology
 Secretion & Absorption
 Molecular & Cellular
 Comparative: Evolution, Adaptation & Environment
Genomics & Biodiversity

References

External links 
 IUPS Official website

Members of the International Council for Science
Physiology organizations
International medical and health organizations
Medical and health organizations based in Ohio
Members of the International Science Council